Giovanni Paolo Lasinio (c. 1796–1855) was an Italian engraver and painter.

Biography
He was the son of the engraver Carlo Lasinio, and together with Rossi engraved forty-four plates of the Campo Santo at Pisa (1832), and took part in the decorations of the Galleries at Florence and Turin. He executed the plates for Ippolito Rosellini's Monumenti dell' Egitto e de la Nubia (Monuments of Egypt and Nubia) (1833–44).

References

1796 births
1855 deaths
Italian engravers
Painters from Tuscany
19th-century Italian painters
19th-century Italian male artists
Italian male painters